During the Russian invasion of Ukraine, the media of both sides, both Russian and Ukrainian, waged an information war and actively spread disinformation. Disinformation has been distributed by governmental agencies and web brigades of the Russian Federation, the Donetsk People's Republic (DPR), and the Luhansk People's Republic (LPR) separatist areas of Ukraine in relation to the 2021–2022 Russo-Ukrainian crisis and the subsequent Russian invasion. Russian disinformation and fake news stories have focused on themes such as false flags claims of Ukrainian and NATO aggression, claims of human rights violations and even genocide carried out by Ukrainians on Russian speakers (such claims often attempt to attribute Russian war crimes to the Ukrainian side), claims that NATO and Ukraine develop biological weapons targeted at Russia, and claims of widespread local populace support for the Russian "liberation". Some of the disinformation has been aimed at promoting hostility towards Ukrainian refugees, intending to weaken international support for Ukraine.

Russian disinformation has been particularly pervasive and successful in Russia itself, due to censorship of war news and state control of most media. While due to the extent of misinformation, Russian media have been restricted from operation and suffered from reputation loss in many Western and developed countries, they have met with more success spreading their point of view in many developing countries. In particular, Chinese state media has been very sympathetic to the Russian side, and has repeatedly censored war news or reproduced Russian fake news and disinformation.

Ukrainian media has also been accused of using propaganda stories, such as the Ghost of Kyiv myth, although such efforts have been much more limited than Russia's disinformation campaign. Both sides have been accused of exaggerating the military losses of the opposing side while minimizing their own.

Aims and attribution 

Disinformation largely attributed to Russia (both state agencies and web brigades) since the 2014 beginning of the Russo-Ukrainian War aimed to generate support for Russia, for example by alleging Ukrainian involvement in serious human rights violations.

In January 2022, aims of disinformation (misinformation intended to deliberately deceive) distributed by Russian authorities included using "wedge issues" to encourage disunity among Western countries in support for Ukraine; to counter themes promoted by the North Atlantic Treaty Organization (NATO); to create plausible deniability for human rights violations carried out by Russian forces; and to create a casus belli for further invading Ukraine.

Facebook uncovered a Russian campaign using fake accounts, and attempts to hack the accounts of high-profile Ukrainians. There are reports of paid Russian government staff searching for "organic content" posted by genuine users in support of the Kremlin, while making sure that these do not run afoul of platform guidelines, then amplifying these posts. Researchers have found that the Internet Research Agency (IRA) has operated numerous troll farms who spam critics of the Kremlin with pro-Putin and pro-war comments.

China state media has largely used Russian state media stories and information from Russian officials, including echoing misinformation and conspiracy theories. In March 2022, China Global Television Network (CGTN) paid for digital ads on Facebook targeting global users with briefings and newscasts featuring pro-Kremlin talking points about the 2022 Russian invasion of Ukraine after Meta Platforms banned Russian state media advertisement buys. The same month, CGTN repeated unsubstantiated Russian claims of biological weapons labs in Ukraine. A leaked internal directive from Beijing News ordered its employees not to publish news reports that were "negative about Russia or pro-West." An analysis found that nearly half of Weibo's social media posts used Russia sources which were pro-Putin or described Ukraine in negative terms, while another third of posts were anti-West and blamed the expansion of NATO, while very few posts described the war in neutral terms. Several history professors have penned an open letter that strongly opposed China's support for "Russia's war against Ukraine" but their post was quickly deleted by censors, while a celebrity who criticized Russia over the invasion had her account suspended.

Due to Russian fake news laws, Facebook and Twitter were blocked by Russia authorities while TikTok banned new uploads. However a study by Tracking Exposed found out that TikTok had blocked all non-Russian content, but has continued to host old videos uploaded by Russia-based accounts and permitted Russian state media to continue posting, described as establishing a "splinternet" within a global social media platform. TikTok's vague censorship has permitted pro-Kremlin news but blocked foreign accounts and critics of the war, as a result "Russians are left with a frozen TikTok, dominated by pro-war content".

Effects 

In February 2022, Eliot Higgins of Bellingcat judged that the quality of Russian misinformation videos had weakened, but remained especially effective for the older generation of Russians.

Some observers noted what they described as a "generational struggle" among Russians over perception of the war, with younger Russians generally opposed to the war and older Russians more likely to accept the narrative presented by state-controlled mass media in Russia. Kataryna Wolczuk, an associate fellow of Chatham House's Russia and Eurasia programme, said that "[Older] Russians are inclined to think in line with the official 'narrative' that Russia is defending Russian speakers in Ukraine, so it's about offering protection rather than aggression." About two-thirds of Russians use television as their primary source of daily news.

Many Ukrainians say that their relatives and friends in Russia trust what the state-controlled media tells them and refuse to believe that there is a war in Ukraine and that the Russian army is shelling Ukrainian cities.

Some Western commentators have claimed that the main reason many Russians have supported Putin and the "special military operation" in Ukraine has to do with the propaganda and disinformation. At the end of March, a poll conducted in Russia by the Levada Center concluded the following: When asked why they think the military operation is taking place, respondents said it was to protect and defend civilians, ethnic Russians or Russian speakers in Ukraine (43%), to prevent an attack on Russia (25%), to get rid of nationalists and "denazify" Ukraine (21%), and to incorporate Ukraine and/or the Donbas region into Russia (3%)."

In China, India, Indonesia, Malaysia, Africa, the Arab world, and Latin America, some social media users trended towards showing sympathy for Russian narratives. A study performed by Airlangga University revealed that 71% of Indonesian netizens supported the invasion. This support was due to affection for Putin's strongman leadership, as well as anti-US and anti-Western political alignments. Additionally, many Indonesians supported Russia due to positive reports of Ramzan Kadyrov and claims of the Azov Battalion covering their bullets with lard to be used against Chechen troops in the invasion.

A series of four online polls by Alexei Navalny's Anti-Corruption Foundation found that between 25 February and 3 March, the share of respondents in Moscow who considered Russia an "aggressor" increased from 29% to 53%, while the share of those who considered Russia a "peacemaker" fell by half from 25% to 12%. On 5 April 2022, Alexei Navalny said the "monstrosity of lies" in the Russian state media "is unimaginable. And, unfortunately, so is its persuasiveness for those who have no access to alternative information." He tweeted that "warmongers" among Russian state media personalities "should be treated as war criminals. From the editors-in-chief to the talk show hosts to the news editors, [they] should be sanctioned now and tried someday."

Russian themes 
Numerous themes of disinformation either originated in Russia or favoring the Russian point of view have been reported.

Delegitimization of Ukraine as a nation and state 

Russian imperialist, ultranationalist, and pejorative themes about Ukrainians as "Little Russians", "part of an all-Russian nation", or "junior partner in a triune Russian nation" have been part of official Russian imperial rhetoric since the seventeenth century, as well as Soviet policy in the twentieth century. Russian president Vladimir Putin has questioned the Ukrainians people's identity and the country's legitimacy for years and spread conspiratorial views of Ukraine's national identity as an "anti-Russian project" in his 2021 essay "On the Historical Unity of Russians and Ukrainians".

After the 2014 Revolution of Dignity, Russian rhetoric delegitimized successive Ukrainian governments as the "Kyiv regime", or as a "Nazi/fascist junta", denigrated it as "led by a band of drug addicts and neo-Nazis", and claimed that it is "under external control" by the West or the United States.

Such denial of nationhood has been cited as part of a campaign of incitement to genocide by Russian state authorities.

Allegations of Nazism 

Among others, as a pretext given by Putin for starting the invasion were unfounded comparisons of the Ukrainian government to Nazis while announcing that one of his objectives is "de-Nazification of Ukraine". These allegations were widely rejected by many experts throughout the world as false and as part of an wider Russian disinformation campaign to justify the war in Ukraine, with many pointing out that Ukrainian President Volodymyr Zelenskyy is Jewish. The Auschwitz-Birkenau State Museum denounced the Russian invasion, saying that "once again, innocent people are being killed purely because of insane pseudo-imperial megalomania", and called for the International Court of Justice to put Russia on trial. The US Holocaust Memorial Museum and Yad Vashem condemned Putin's misuse of Holocaust history.

A New York Times analysis of 8,000 Russian websites recorded a sudden spike of allegations of Nazism in Ukraine on the day of the Russian invasion of Ukraine. Many analysts pointed out that far-right parties in Ukraine combined received only 2% of the 2019 parliamentary votes in Ukraine, well below the 5% threshold for representation. One expert explained the unfounded allegation about Nazism in Ukraine as an attempt to calm down Russian cognitive dissonance when faced with Russian war crimes, such as the Bucha massacre, "It helps them justify these atrocities", he said. Others have called these allegations as an attempt to incite hatred against Ukraine through establishment of a "fake threat scenario". The Jews of Ukraine similarly rejected Putin's propaganda about Nazism in Ukraine today and in the past.

Statements of denazification continued to permeate throughout Russian media and justification for the war. On 1 March, a large number of diplomats at the UN Human Rights Council (UNHRC) in Geneva staged a walkout in protest of the Russian invasion of Ukraine. Russian foreign minister Sergey Lavrov began his prepared remarks to the assembly via video from Moscow, in which he echoed the statements of denazification in Putin's speech: "The goal of our actions is to save people by fulfilling our allied obligations, as well as to demilitarize and denazify Ukraine so that such things never happen again." In a RIA Novosti op-ed published in early April, "What Russia should do with Ukraine", Timofey Sergeytsev argued strongly for the full destruction of Ukraine as a state and the Ukrainian national identity in the ambit of the denazification of the latter. The Ukrainian state was, according to Sergeytsev, to be renamed after the war. The op-ed attracted criticism from as far afield as Slavoj Žižek. In an analysis of the article, American historian Timothy Snyder pointed out that the use of words "Nazi" and "denazification" by the Russian regime was historically inaccurate.

By early May, usage of the term in Russian media appeared to be on a decline, reportedly because it had not gained traction with the Russian public, although the term experienced a slight resurgence when United Russia party member Oleg Viktorovich Morozov called in the Duma for the denazification of Poland later that month. The Russian ambassador to Bulgaria, Eleonora Mitrofanova, has used the moniker "Nazi regime in Kyiv" to refer to the post-Revolution of Dignity administrations of Petro Poroshenko and Volodymyr Zelenskyy.

In May 2022, Aleksandr Dugin, frustrated by "strange and convoluted arguments" used by Lavrov to explain the Russian meaning of "denazification", proposed that it is necessary to simply "identify Ukrainian Nazism with Russophobia". Dugin argued that in the same way as Jews have a "monopoly" of definition of antisemitism, in this way Russia holds a "monopoly" on the definition of Russophobia and "Ukrainian Nazism".

According to Ukrainian-American journalist Natalia Antonova, "Russia's present-day war of aggression is refashioned by propaganda into a direct continuation of the legacy of the millions of Russian soldiers who died to stop" Nazi Germany in the Great Patriotic War.

Claims of Ukrainian and NATO aggression 
Spokesmen of Russian state media, the breakaway Donetsk People Republic, or Vladimir Putin have made unsubstantiated claims of aggression by NATO or Ukraine against Russian citizens, including assassination, sabotage, genocide, and the development of bio-weapons including birds carrying fatal diseases.

Assassination attempts 
According to Bellingcat, a supposed bombing of a "separatist police chief" by a "Ukrainian spy", broadcast on Russian state television, showed visual evidence of the bombing of an old "green army vehicle". The old car's registration plate was that of the separatist police chief, but the same licence plate was also seen on a different, new SUV.

On 18 February 2022, the Luhansk People's Republic showed video appearing to show the removal of a car full of explosives that had been prepared for blowing up a train full of women and children evacuating to Russia. The video's metadata showed that it had been recorded on 12 June 2019.

Sabotage attempts 
The breakaway Donetsk People's Republic released a video on 18 February 2022 that claimed to show Poles trying to blow up a chlorine tank. The video was distributed further by Russian media. The video's metadata showed that it was created on 8 February 2022, and included a mix of different pieces of audio or video, including a 2010 YouTube video from a military firing range in Finland.

Ukrainian intelligence attributed responsibility for the video to the Russian intelligence service GRU.

Genocide in Donbas 

In mid February 2022, Russian president Vladimir Putin baselessly claimed that Ukraine was carrying out genocide in Donbas. He said the purpose of the military "operation" in Ukraine was to "protect the people" in the predominantly Russian-speaking region of Donbas who, according to him, "for eight years now, [had] been facing humiliation and genocide perpetrated by the Kyiv regime". Putin's claims were dismissed by the international community, and Russian claims of genocide have been widely rejected as baseless. More than 3,000 civilians were killed as a result of the war in Donbas, but there is no evidence to support the claim that Ukraine committed the genocide of Russian-speaking people. The European Commission has also rejected the allegations as "Russian disinformation". The US embassy in Ukraine called the Russian genocide claim a "reprehensible falsehood". Ned Price, a spokesperson for the US State Department, said that Moscow was making such claims as an excuse for invading Ukraine.

In March and April 2022, propaganda in the state-controlled media and on pro-Kremlin Telegram channels has falsely accused Ukrainian troops of attacking civilian targets in Mariupol and bombing Ukrainian cities.

Moreover, the fatality rate of the War in Donbass was actually falling prior to the 2022 Russian invasion: in 2017, there were 117 conflict-related civilian deaths, while in 2020 this was down to 26 deaths, and further down to 25 deaths in 2021.

Biological weapons labs 

In March 2022, Russia made unsubstantiated allegations that Ukraine was developing biological weapons in a network of labs linked to the US. The Ministry of Foreign Affairs of the People's Republic of China and Chinese state media amplified Russian claims. QAnon promoters were also echoing the disinformation. BBC Reality Check found no evidence supporting the claims. The United Nations also refuted the claim. Russian biologists in and outside of Russia have debunked the claims, stating that the allegations are "transparently false".

According to researcher Adam Rawnsley, the Kremlin has a history of discrediting ordinary biology labs in former Soviet republics, having previously spread conspiracy theories about Georgia and Kazakhstan similar to the accusations deployed against Ukraine.

Birds as bio-weapons 
Prior to March 2022, the Russian Ministry of Defense had made unsubstantiated accusations that the United States was manufacturing bio-weapons in Ukraine. In March, the Ministry followed up with another conspiracy theory, which claims that the U.S. is training birds in Ukraine to spread disease among Russian citizens, according to a statement given by Major General Igor Konashenkov, spokesman of the Ministry to Russian state-controlled media. Specific details were given about diseases involved, including the name of a specific strain of flu with 50% mortality, as well as Newcastle disease. Media reports included maps, documents, and photos of birds with American military insignia, and also claimed that live, infected birds had been captured in eastern Ukraine.

The claims were laughed off by U.S. State Department spokesman, who called them "outright lies", "total nonsense", "absurd", "laughable" and "propaganda". Director of the CIA William Burns told the U.S. Senate that Russia was using such claims to prepare the terrain for a biological or chemical attack by Russian forces against Ukraine, which they would then blame on the United States and Ukraine.

Combat-mosquitoes 
On 28 October 2022, Vasily Nebenzya, the Permanent Representative of Russia to the United Nations, accused Ukraine of using drones with "combat mosquitoes" which spread "dangerous viruses". Andrii Yermak, the Head of the Office of the President of Ukraine, laughed off these accusations.

Ukrainian plans to use a dirty bomb 

In March 2022, Russian state-controlled news agencies claimed, without evidence, that Ukraine was developing a plutonium-based dirty bomb nuclear weapon at the Chernobyl Nuclear Power Plant.

In a series of calls to foreign defense officials made in October 2022, Russian Minister of Defence Sergei Shoigu similarly claimed that Ukraine was preparing a "provocation" involving the use of a dirty bomb. The Institute for the Study of War suggested a desire to slow or suspend foreign aid to Ukraine as a possible motive for the allegations. The foreign ministries of France, the United Kingdom and the United States rejected "Russia's transparently false allegations". In a briefing, the Russian Ministry of Defence used photos of the Beloyarsk Nuclear Power Station, the Novosibirsk Chemical Concentrates Plant, the aftermath of the September 11 attacks, and a photo from a 2010 presentation by the Slovenian  as "evidence" for its claims.

Claimed success of Russian efforts

Flight and surrender of Ukrainian President 
The Russian state media agency TASS claimed that Zelenskyy fled Kyiv following the invasion and also that he had surrendered. Zelenskyy used social media to post statements, videos and photos to counter the Russian disinformation.

Russian state-owned television channel Russia-1 spread false claims that Volodymyr Zelenskyy fled Ukraine following the 10 October 2022 missile strikes.

Other claims

Ukrainian satanism and use of black magic 
In May 2022, as the invasion continued, Russian state media claimed that Ukraine was using black magic to fend off the Russian military. RIA Novosti claimed that evidence of black magic had been found in an eastern Ukrainian village; according to their report, Ukrainian soldiers had allegedly consecrated their "weapons with blood magick" at a location with a "satanic seal".

In October 2022, assistant secretary of the Security Council of Russia Aleksey Pavlov called for the "de-Satanization" of Ukraine, claiming that the country had turned into a "totalitarian hypersect". In an article for the Russian state-owned Argumenty i Fakty newspaper, he identified the Chabad-Lubavitch Hasidic movement as one of the "hundreds of neo-pagan cults" operating in Ukraine. Russia's chief rabbi Berel Lazar wrote a letter to Russian authorities, asking them to condemn Aleksey Pavlov's comments, which he described as "a new variety of old blood libels". About 70% of Ukrainians are religious, and half of those attend religious services.

False flag fakes 
In March 2022, videos were discovered purporting to show Ukrainian-produced disinformation about missile strikes inside Ukraine which were then "debunked" as some other event outside Ukraine. However, this may be the first case of a disinformation false-flag operation, as the original, supposedly "Ukraine-produced" disinformation was never disseminated by anyone, and was in fact preventive disinformation created specifically to be debunked and cause confusion and mitigate the impact on the Russian public of real footage of Russian strikes within Ukraine that may get past Russian-controlled media. According to Patrick Warren, head of Clemson's Media Forensics Hub, "It's like Russians actually pretending to be Ukrainians spreading disinformation. ... The reason that it's so effective is because you don't actually have to convince someone that it's true. It's sufficient to make people uncertain as to what they should trust."

Olenivka prison massacre, described by most independent experts as a Russian-orchestrated sabotage, has been reported by Russian media as a missile attack by Ukraine. While the exact cause of the incident has still not been conclusively confirmed, most experts conclude the Russian version highly improbable.

Anti-refugee sentiments 
Russian disinformation has also attempted to promote anti-refugee sentiments in Poland and other countries dealing with the influx of mostly Ukrainian refugees from the war. Social media accounts identified as having ties to Russia have promoted stories including claims of refugees committing crimes or being unfairly privileged, or about locals discriminating against refugees (in particular, against black and non-Ukrainian refugees). Such disinformation is intended to weaken international support for Ukraine.

News masquerading as Western coverage 
During the crisis, a number of fabricated CNN headlines and stories went viral on social media. Misinformation spread on social media included a faked image of CNN reporting that Steven Seagal had been seen alongside the Russian military, false tweets claiming that a CNN journalist had been killed in Ukraine, a CNN lower third that was digitally altered to include a claim that Putin had issued a statement warning India not to interfere in the conflict, and another that was altered to claim that Putin planned to delay the 2022 Russian invasion of Ukraine until "Biden delivers weapons to Ukraine for Russia to capture", as well as a fabricated CNN tweet supposedly reporting on a figure referred to as "the Kharkiv Kid finder" alongside an image that actually portrayed the YouTuber Vaush, who resides in the US and was not in Kharkiv at the time.

In addition to fake news with CNN logo, other Western stations have had similar fakes distributed, for example BBC or DW.

"Grandmother with red flag" 

A video showing an elderly woman holding a Soviet flag to greet the Ukrainian military has been widely spread in Runet since March 2022. The grandmother with a red flag was turned into an iconic image by Russian propaganda. Allegedly, it represents the desire of "ordinary Ukrainians" to reunite with their "Russian brothers".

Anna Ivanovna, the subject of the "grandmother with red flag" video, explained that she mistook the Ukrainian military for Russian invaders and she wanted to "placate" them with a red Bolshevik flag so they would not destroy the village. She now regrets it and feels like a "traitor". Her house near Kharkiv was destroyed by the Russian army, and she and her husband have been evacuated. She cursed the Russian army which she deemed was responsible for shelling her house. The Ukrainian military appealed to the public to not chastise Ivanovna, who was a victim herself.

Denial of Russian war crimes

During the Russian invasion of Ukraine, numerous war crimes and crimes against humanity were recorded and extensively documented, including attacks on civilians and energy-related infrastructure, wilful killings, unlawful confinement, torture, rape, unlawful transfers and deportations of children, and others. Despite this, Russian officials denied all of the war crimes perpetrated by the Russian forces. Russian Foreign Minister Sergey Lavrov called the Bucha massacre a "fake attack" used against Russia, claiming it had been staged. He said that Russian forces had left Bucha on 30 March while evidence of killings had emerged, according to him, four days later. 

On 4 April, at the United Nations, the Russian representative Vasily Nebenzya said that the bodies in the videos were not there before the Russian forces withdrew from Bucha. This was contradicted by satellite images which showed that the bodies were there as early as 19 March; the position of the corpses in the satellite images match the smartphone photos taken in early April.

The Russian Defence Ministry's Telegram channel reposted a report stating Russian forces had not targeted civilians during the battle. According to the statement, a massacre could not have been covered up by the Russian military, and the mass grave in the city was filled with victims of Ukrainian airstrikes. The Ministry said it had analyzed a video purporting to show the bodies of dead civilians in Bucha, and said the corpses filmed were moving. This claim was investigated by the BBC's Moscow Department, which concluded there was no evidence the video had been staged. During the Mariupol theatre airstrike, Russian officials blamed Ukrainian forces of bombing themselves, though independent sources confirmed that Russia was responsible.

Ukrainian themes

The Ghost of Kyiv 

On the second day of the 2022 Russian invasion of Ukraine, videos and picture went viral on social media, with claims that a Ukrainian pilot nicknamed the "Ghost of Kyiv" had shot down 6 Russian fighter jets in the first 30 hours of the war. However, there have been no credible evidence that he existed. A video of the alleged pilot was shared on Facebook and the official Twitter account of the Ukrainian Ministry of Defence, was later found to be from the video game Digital Combat Simulator World. An altered photo was also shared by the former president of Ukraine, Petro Poroshenko. On 30 April 2022, Ukrainian Air Force asked the "Ukrainian community not to neglect the basic rules of information hygiene" and to "check the sources of information, before spreading it", stating that the Ghost of Kyiv "embodies the collective spirit of the highly qualified pilots of the Tactical Aviation Brigade who are successfully defending Kyiv and the region".

Snake Island campaign 

On 24 February 2022, the Ukrainian newspaper Ukrainska Pravda published a viral audio recording in which the crew of a Russian warship offered Ukrainian border guards on Serpent Island to surrender to the Russian forces. One of the border guards responded by saying, "Russian warship, go fuck yourself".

Ukrainian President Volodymyr Zelenskyy announced the death of the border guards. A few days later, Ukrainian officials admitted that the border guards were alive and had been captured by Russian troops. The New York Times stated that "The Ghost of Kyiv" story was likely to be false and that the claim that the Snake Island border guards had all been killed was false, and that both cases were either propaganda or a campaigns to raise morale.

Ukrainian southern counteroffensive 
Ukrainian special forces have said that the highly publicized Ukrainian counteroffensive in the Kherson Oblast was a disinformation campaign aimed at distracting Russia from the real offensive that was being prepared in the Kharkiv Oblast. Taras Berezovets, a spokesman for the Ukrainian special forces brigade, said: "[It] was a big special disinformation operation. ... [Russia] thought it would be in the south and moved their equipment. Then, instead of the south, the offensive happened where they least expected, and this caused them to panic and flee".

Russian mobilization 
On 22 September 2022, the "conscript base" of the 2022 Russian mobilization from the hacker group Anonymous began to spread in Ukrainian Telegram channels. As it was claimed, the distributed file allegedly contained the passport data of more than 305 thousand Russians subject to mobilization "first of all." It was also noted that Anonymous hackers obtained the data by hacking the website of the Ministry of Defense of the Russia, but the group itself didn't report this leak. The Ministry of Defense of the Russia didn't comment on the alleged leak, but reposted "War on Fakes", a Telegram channel. The report says that the published database "is compiled from several open databases and has nothing to do with the Ministry of Defense." Ruslan Leviev, the founder of Conflict Intelligence Team, and Andrei Zakharov, a correspondent of the BBC News Russian, are of the opinion that the "conscript base" is a fake.

On 11 January 2023, the Main Directorate of Intelligence of Ukraine reported that on 9 January the Federal Security Service of Russia sent an order to all border services to restrict the departure of Russian citizens subject to conscription for military service. The head of the human rights group "Agora"  called the "orders" that appeared on social networks to close the borders a fake: "This information is not true. If the borders were closed, it would immediately become known. The orders are issued improperly, although they are similar to the original ones". The Press Secretary of the President of Russia Dmitry Peskov regarded the statement of the Ukrainian military intelligence as "information sabotage".

Others

Turkish mercenaries 
In October 2022, a video had been gaining traction on social media allegedly showing Turkish mercenaries going to fight for Russia in the Ukraine war. The video was first published by a pro-Russian Telegram channel claiming that "Turkish legionnaires joined the Russian army and will take part in combat operations in Ukraine". But it quickly gained traction when Nexta shared it with a similar claim. However journalists from Euronews Turkish-language service confirmed that the men are speaking a dialect of Turkish but are not from Turkey. The mix between this dialect and some Russian words signals that these men were most likely Meskhetian Turks (Ahiska Turks). Euronews spoke to a representative of Ahiska Turks abroad who confirmed that the men in the video are speaking the Ahiska dialect. He also told that he believes that these men living in Russia and therefore being mobilised for the war in Ukraine. Adding that, since Ahiska Turks consider themselves Turkish, this is why the soldiers were seen with a Turkish flag in the video.

Release of unproven intelligence 
United States (US) officials claimed that they had intelligence suggesting that Russia might be preparing to use chemical weapons in Ukraine, a claim that US President Joe Biden later echoed publicly. However, in April 2022, U.S. officials told NBC News that there is no evidence of Russia bringing chemical weapons near Ukraine, that the intelligence was based on weak evidence, and that the intelligence was released to deter Russia from using chemical weapons.

U.S. officials claimed that Russia had turned to China for potential military assistance, a claim one European official and two U.S. officials said "lacked hard evidence". U.S. officials told NBC News that there are no indications that China is considering providing weapons to Russia and that the Biden administration made this claim to discourage China from actually providing assistance to Russia. Dave DeCamp of Antiwar.com noted that The New York Times, The Telegraph, and the Associated Press all reported the claim from U.S. officials as if it was objective reality.

Censorship

In Russia 

On 4 March 2022, President Putin signed into law a bill introducing prison sentences of up to 15 years for those who publish "knowingly false information" about the Russian military and its operations, leading to some media outlets in Russia to stop reporting on Ukraine or shutting their media outlet. Although the 1993 Russian Constitution has an article expressly prohibiting censorship, the Russian censorship apparatus Roskomnadzor ordered the country's media to only use information from Russian state sources or face fines and blocks, and accused a number of independent media outlets of spreading "unreliable socially significant untrue information" about the shelling of Ukrainian cities by the Russian army and civilian deaths.

Roskomnadzor launched an investigation against the Novaya Gazeta, Echo of Moscow, inoSMI, MediaZona, New Times, Dozhd (TV Rain), and other independent Russian media outlets for publishing "inaccurate information about the shelling of Ukrainian cities and civilian casualties in Ukraine as a result of the actions of the Russian Army". On 1 March 2022, the Russian government blocked access to Dozhd, as well as Echo of Moscow, in response to their coverage of the invasion of Ukraine by Russian forces. The channel closed, with its general director announcing they would be "temporarily halting its operations", on 3 March 2022.

In Ukraine 
In 2021, Ukrainian National Security and Defense Council banned pro-Russian opposition TV stations 112 Ukraine, NewsOne and ZIK. Zelensky's spokeswoman explained that the decision is intended to "protect national security" as the banned stations became "tools of war". In March 2022, Zelensky signed a decree, introducing a "unified information policy" under martial law, uniting news broadcast on national channels into a single platform. Heads of the TV channels rejected accusations that the content is dictated by the government, stating that censorship is focused on withholding information such as Ukrainian military positions. Some commentators noted that airtime is "almost exclusively given to people close to the president".

In China 

Coverage of the war in social media was censored in China. The Chinese media have been reported as "regularly quoting disinformation and conspiracy theories from Russian sources".

Countering Russian disinformation 
The United States Department of State and the European External Action Service of the European Union (EU) published guides aiming to respond to Russian disinformation. Twitter paused all ad campaigns in Ukraine and Russia in an attempt to curb misinformation spread by ads. European Commission president Ursula von der Leyen announced an EU-wide ban of Russian state-sponsored RT and Sputnik news channels on 27 February, after Poland and Estonia had done so days before.

Reddit, an American social news aggregation, content rating, and discussion website, quarantined subreddits r/Russia, the national subreddit of Russia, and r/GenZedong, a self-described "Dengist" subreddit in March 2022, after both the subreddits were spreading Russian disinformation. In the case of r/Russia, the site's administrators removed one of the moderators, for spreading disinformation. Sister sub of r/Russia, r/RussiaPolitics was also quarantined for similar reasons. When the subreddits are quarantined, they don't show up in searches, recommendations and user feeds, and anyone who tries to access the quarantined subreddits would be shown a warning regarding the content, which they must acknowledge in order to access it.

In May 2022 a group calling themselves NAFO was created with the object of posting irreverent commentary about the war and memes promoting Ukraine or mocking the Russian war effort and strategy using a "cartoon dog" based on the Shiba Inu. NAFO was seen by The Washington Post as having significant effects against Russian troll farms. On 28 August 2022, the official Twitter account of the Ministry of Defense of Ukraine tweeted its appreciation of NAFO, with an image of missiles being fired and a "Fella" dressed in a combat uniform, hands on face, in a posture of appreciation.

See also 
 Nuclear threats during the 2022 Russian invasion of Ukraine
 Russian web brigades

References

External links 
 Tracking Social Media Takedowns and Content Moderation During the 2022 Russian Invasion of Ukraine
 An Alternate Reality: How Russia’s State TV Spins the Ukraine War; The New York Times, December 15, 2022.

 
Fake news
Pseudohistory
Russo-Ukrainian War
Propaganda by war
Prelude to the 2022 Russian invasion of Ukraine
Disinformation operations